The 2000 Welwyn Hatfield District Council election took place on 6 May 2000 to elect members of Welwyn Hatfield District Council in Hertfordshire, England. One third of the council was up for election and the Labour Party gained overall control of the council from no overall control. Overall turnout in the election was 31.71%, down from 33.09% in the 1999 election.

After the election, the composition of the council was:
Labour 25
Conservative 23

Election result
The results saw Labour gain control of the council with a majority of 2 over the Conservatives, which was a reversal of the trend of the 2000 local elections where Labour overall lost almost 600 councillors.

Ward results

References

2000
2000 English local elections
2000s in Hertfordshire